Horror films released in the 1960s are listed in the following articles:
 List of horror films of 1960
 List of horror films of 1961
 List of horror films of 1962
 List of horror films of 1963
 List of horror films of 1964
 List of horror films of 1965
 List of horror films of 1966
 List of horror films of 1967
 List of horror films of 1968
 List of horror films of 1969

1960s
horror